Welnek No. 38 formerly Summerside 38 is a Miꞌkmaq reserve located in Antigonish County, Nova Scotia.

It is administratively part of the Paqꞌtnkek First Nation.

References

Indian reserves in Nova Scotia
Communities in Antigonish County, Nova Scotia
Mi'kmaq in Canada